Zębowice may refer to the following places in Poland:
Zębowice, Lower Silesian Voivodeship (southwestern Poland)
Zębowice, Opole Voivodeship (southern Poland)